Run Wild, Run Free is a 1969 British drama film directed by Richard C. Sarafian and starring John Mills. The film was written by David Rook, based on his novel The White Colt, and shot on location in Dartmoor, Devon, England.

The film features a psychosomatically mute English boy (Lester), who sights a wild, white pony on the Dartmoor moors and sets out to tame him. He is supported by an old moorman (Mills) and a neighboring farm girl, Fiona Fullerton. Much of the film is devoted to him searching for the pony and his family searching for him across the beautiful, foggy moors.

Cast
 John Mills as The Moorman 
 Gordon Jackson as Mr. Ransome
 Sylvia Syms as Mrs. Ransome
 Mark Lester as Phillip Ransome
 Bernard Miles as Reg 
 Fiona Fullerton as Diana

Reception
A. H. Weiler of The New York Times wrote: "If it is not a milestone in its genre, its cloying quotient is decidedly low. As a dissection of the rapport between two youngsters and a couple of wild animals in a largely uncomprehending world, it has enough honesty and genuine sentimentality to move mere grown-ups too." Roger Ebert of the Chicago Sun-Times gave the film three stars out of four and called it "a sensitive and beautiful film, and probably ideal for kids from about the fourth grade up." Gene Siskel of the Chicago Tribune also gave the film three stars out of four and wrote, "On the face of it, the film seems pat ... But the well-written script departs from tradition and gives us a story full of unpredictability and insight." Kevin Thomas of the Los Angeles Times wrote: "Quite unabashedly, Run Wild, Run Free celebrates the power of love, yet it happily avoids the treacle – except for an overripe score – that characterizes most pictures about children and animals. It pulls out all stops emotionally but gets away with it because it has simplicity and intelligence." The Monthly Film Bulletin wrote that "Richard Sarafian's combination of generally pedestrian images with a quivery, quavery wild-heart-of-Dartmoor sensitivity suggests some uncertainty as to whether the picture is aimed at the pony club set, or their more susceptible mothers and grandmothers."

See also
 List of British films of 1969

References

External links
 
 
 
 

1969 films
1969 drama films
British children's drama films
Columbia Pictures films
Dartmoor
Films about autism
Films about children
Films about dysfunctional families
Films about horses
Films based on British novels
Films set in Devon
Films shot in Devon
1960s children's films
1969 directorial debut films
Films directed by Richard C. Sarafian
1970s English-language films
1960s English-language films
1960s British films
1970s British films